A petard is a small bomb used for blowing up gates and walls when breaching fortifications, originally invented in France in 1579. A typical petard was a conical or rectangular metal device containing  of gunpowder, with a slow match for a fuse.

Etymology
Pétard comes from the Middle French péter, to fart, from the root pet, expulsion of intestinal gas, derived from the Latin peditus, past participle of pedere, to break wind.  In modern French, a pétard is a firecracker (and it is the basis for the word for firecracker in several other European languages).

Pétardiers were deployed during sieges of castles or fortified cities. The pétard, a rather primitive and exceedingly dangerous explosive device, comprised a brass or iron bell-shaped device filled with gunpowder and affixed to a wooden base called a madrier. This was attached to a wall or gate using hooks and rings, the fuse lit and, if successful, the resulting explosive force, concentrated at the target point, would blow a hole in the obstruction, allowing assault troops to enter.

Shakespeare's phrase "hoist with his own petard"meaning that one could be lifted (blown) upward by one's own bomb, or in other words, be foiled by one's own planhas become an idiom that means "to be harmed by one's own plan (to harm someone else)" or "to fall into one's own trap".

Overview 
Petards were often placed either inside tunnels under walls or directly upon gates. The petard's shape allowed the concussive pressure of the blast to be applied entirely towards the destruction of the target structure.  Depending on design, a petard could be secured by propping it against the wall or gate using beams, as illustrated, or nailing it in place on a madrier (a thick wooden board fixed in advance to the end of the petard).

Variants 

The weapon was carried by the Churchill AVRE tank and was sufficient to breach or demolish many bunkers and earthworks.

In Maltese English, home-made fireworks—a popular and widespread albeit highly dangerous hobby in Malta—are called petards (the word in Maltese, murtal, is related to "mortar"). These petards are detonated by the dozen during feasts dedicated to local patron saints. Maltese petards are made by common people without formal education in chemistry, as an exercise in traditional handiwork.

See also 
 Fougasse (weapon)
 List of inventors killed by their own invention
 Shaped charge

References

Further reading

External links

 

Bombs
Anti-fortification weapons
French inventions